There are about 30 state boarding schools in England, providing state-funded education but charging for boarding. In addition, the Five Islands School in St Mary's, Isles of Scilly, provides free boarding during the week to secondary students from other islands.

List 
The gender shown is that of the boarding provision; some of these schools have mixed day provision.

See also
 State-funded schools (England)
 Education in England

Notes

References

External links

 Schools (including state boarding schools), Boarding Schools' Association

England
Boarding schools in England
State funded boarding schools in England
Lists of schools in England